André-Louis-Adolphe Laoust or André Laoust (1843–1924) was a French sculptor born in Douai.

1843 births
1924 deaths
People from Douai
20th-century French sculptors
19th-century French sculptors
French male sculptors
19th-century French male artists